The Calico Rock Historic District encompasses the historic central portion of the business district of Calico Rock, Arkansas.  The district includes a single block of Main Street (Arkansas Highway 5 between Rodman Street and Walnut Street, and includes properties on Rodman Street.  This area's buildings date from between 1902 and 1930, and are all of brick and masonry construction.  Although Calico Rock was settled by the 1820s and was the site of a 19th-century ferry crossing of the White River, its central business area suffered from fires and floods, and boomed economically with the arrival of the railroad in 1904.

The district was listed on the National Register of Historic Places in 1985, and enlarged in 1989 to include the River View Hotel on Rodman Street.

See also
National Register of Historic Places listings in Izard County, Arkansas

References

External links

Italianate architecture in Arkansas
Izard County, Arkansas
Historic districts on the National Register of Historic Places in Arkansas
National Register of Historic Places in Izard County, Arkansas